Secret Story 8 is the eighth season of the French reality television series Secret Story, a show which is based loosely on the international Big Brother format. TF1 has formalized an eighth season on January 27, 2014.

Whereas several rumors explain that Benjamin Castaldi would not host the eighth season of Secret Story, he stated that he will. It was said Benjamin Castaldi will only host the live shows and not the daily recaps anymore, unlike previous seasons  and that La Voix (Big Brother) will voice off the daily recaps, but it was revealed at the press release that Benjamin Castaldi would still host daily recaps and that nothing changes compared to previous seasons. Adrien Lemaitre returns to host the spin-off show: After Secret.

Due to the 2014 FIFA World Cup, this season is shortened and lasted 10 weeks. It started on Friday 18 July 2014 on TF1. It was confirmed the finale is on Friday 26 September 2014 at 10:45 p.m.

Leila Ben Khalifa, ex contestant of Grande Fratello 6, is the winner of Secret Story 8.

House of Secrets 
For the first time, this season's house is located on the rooftop of the studios of AB Productions which was used in the 1990s where many popular sitcoms were filmed, as Hélène et les Garçons and Premiers baisers. Perched on a building, the House of Secrets offers to the contestants a wide view of Paris.

The house has three different levels. The first and second floor, and a mysterious secret basement. The garden has a floating pool and for the first time in Secret Story's history a jacuzzi, a small terrace with a large table for breakfasts and dinners. Bedrooms are in the second floor and have windows with charming shutters.

The house has 64 cameras with most of them hidden behind countless mirrors and 40 microphones.

Housemates

Abdel 
 Abdel Sellou is 43 years old from Paris, France and  a father of three. He entered on Day 1. He was ejected on Day 5. His secret is : "The story of my life generated 20 millions of entries in box office"

Aymeric 
 Aymeric is 22 from Versailles. His secret is : "I am an imposter of the House of Secrets", he shares this secret with three other housemates : Leila, Sara and Stéfan, and his secret identity is : Vince. He entered on Day 1 in the House of Imposters. He was ejected on Day 56, After a fight with Sara.

Elodie 
 Elodie Ortisset is a 22 years old artistic director in event planning from Montauban, France and is single. She entered on Day 1. she was evicted on Day 22.

Geoffrey 
 Geoffrey is a 26 years old electrician from France. He lost his father four years ago. He entered on Day 1. He was evicted on Day 29.

Iliesse 
 Iliesse is a 20 years old business student from Paris, France. He entered the House on Day 1. He was evicted on Day 15.

Jessica 
 Jessica Silva is from Toulouse, France and works as a model . She occasionally plays soccer. Jessica has a boyfriend, and two  identical sisters, Chloé and Audrey. La Voix made her travel to Las Vegas where she must build a secret in less than 24 hours before the launch show with  Steph. If she doesn't succeed Big Brother's task, access to the  main house will be denied. She entered on Day 1. She became the runner up on Day 71.

Joanna 
 Joanna Thomae is a 31-year-old mother from Entressen, France. She entered on Day 1. She walked on Day 17. with the secret : "I lived a romance with Michael Jackson".

Julie 
 Julie Couillard is a 31-year-old nail prosthetist from Le Havre, France. She's in a relationship with her boyfriend of 12 years and has a 2-year-old daughter with him. Her secret is that she is hyperthymesic. She entered on Day 1. She was evicted on Day 64.

Leila 
 Leila Ben Khalifa is a 32-year-old actress from Tunisia. She now lives in Milan, Italy. She was a contestant during the sixth season of the Italian version of Big Brother. Her secret is : "I am an imposter of the House of Secrets", she shares this secret with three other housemates : Aymeric, Sara and Stéfan, and her secret identity is : Virginie. She entered on Day 1 in the House of Imposters. She won the series on Day 71.

Nathalie 
 Nathalie is a 43-year-old businesswoman from Bastia, France. She entered the house on Day 1. She finished in fourth place on Day 71. with the secret : "My boyfriend is half my age" and entered with a secret task to act as if housemate Vivian was her 22-year-old son.

Sacha 
 Sacha is a 23-year-old musician, singer and make up artist from Belgium. He entered on Day 1. He was evicted on Day 43.

Sara 
 Sara Rose is a 20-year-old business student from the Var, France. She describes herself as « capricious, angry and ultra strategist ». She is ready to do anything  to win, even seducing male housemates. She works as a model to make ends meet. Her secret is : "I am an imposter of the House of Secrets" She shares this secret with three other housemates : Leila, Aymeric and Stéfan, and her secret identity is : Lois. She entered on Day 1 in the House of Imposters. She was ejected on Day 56, After a fight with Aymeric.

Stéfan 
 Stéfan is a 25-year-old business man from France who works  in the  video game industry. His mother died from  cancer when he was 9 years old. His secret is : "I am an imposter of the House of Secrets", he shares this secret with three other housemates : Leila, Sara and Aymeric, and his secret identity is : Matt. He entered on Day 1 in the House of Imposters. He was evicted on Day 36.

Stéphane « Steph » 
 Stéphane Rodrigues is a 31-year-old model from Luxembourg. He is also a dancer and appeared in a  Shy'm music video. La Voix made him travel to Las Vegas where he must build a secret in less than 24 hours before the launch show with another contestant : Jessica. If he doesn't succeed Big Brother's task, access to the  main house will be denied. He entered on Day 1. He was evicted on Day 50.

Vivian 
 Vivian is 22 and is from Bastia, France. He entered the house on Day 1. He finished in third place on Day 71. with the secret : "My girlfriend is twice my age" and entered with a secret task to act as if housemate Nathalie was his 43-year-old mother.

Houseguests

Anaïs 
 Anaïs Camizuli is the winner of Secret Story 7.

Benoît 
 Benoît Dubois is the winner of Secret Story 4. He entered as a guest in the Secret Story 8's house on Day/Night 47 and stays only for an evening along with Amélie.

Amélie 
 Amélie Neten participated to Secret Story 4 in 2010. She also participated to Secret Story 7 as a guest and entered on Day 80, and quit on Day 87. She entered as a guest in the Secret Story 8's house on Day/Night 47 and stays only for an evening along with Benoît.

Zelko 
 Zelko Stojanovic participated to Secret Story 5 in 2011 and was runner-up.

Zarko 
 Zarko Stojanovic participated to Secret Story 5 in 2011 and is also the winner of Veliki Brat 2013.

Secrets

Weekly summary

Nominations

Notes 
:  In round one of nominations only female housemates could nominate and only male housemates could be nominated.
:  As Abdel was ejected on Day 5 by La Voix for inappropriate behavior, nominations were canceled.
:  Housemates had to choose two imposters to enter the house, male housemates must choose between Sara and Leila and female housemates must choose between Aymeric and Stéfan. Later, as they were chosen by the housemates, Aymeric and Leila had a dilemma to choose between Stéfan and Sara to enter the house, they chose Stéfan. Later, Stéfan received a dilemma, if he accepts to pick Sara's place to face the public vote, all the imposters (Aymeric, Leila, Sara and Stéfan) are immune. He accepted.
:  In round two of nominations only female housemates could nominate and only male housemates could be nominated.
:  In order to destroy clues on their secrets, Julie and Geoffrey accepted to remove the immunity of Sara and Leila for nominations of week 3.
:  Élodie revealed her secret and therefore is nominated.
:  In round four of nominations, only male housemates could be nominated. 
:  As a revenge for manipulating male housemates to nominate Leila, this latter had opportunity to nominate Jessica. She accepted the offer of La Voix.
:  Leila and Sara have power to nominate two male housemates as they nominated them in Week 3.
:  In the room of shields, Stéfan had to give a fake immunity to one of his fellow housemate while it is a nomination. He must remain secret until La Voix reveals it on Day 32. He decided to nominate Sara by giving her a fake immunity.
:  In round five of nominations, all the housemates were eligible to nominate and to nominate whoever they want, in duos. Aymeric and Nathalie, Leila and Sacha, Jessica and Stéfan, Sara and Steph, Vivian and Julie.
:  Stéfan and Steph received the fewest votes to save and therefore are in danger for eviction. All the housemates have to save one of them. Sara and Jessica were not eligible to save one of them as they were nominated.
:  Housemates are divided into two houses. Jessica, Steph, Julie, Sacha and Vivian in the main house and Sara, Nathalie, Aymeric and Leila in the little house. Each house had to elect a "leader" of their house. Main house chose Sacha, little house chose Nathalie. As chiefs of their houses, Sacha and Nathalie will nominate on Day 40 two housemates of the opposite house.
:  After being up for eviction along Sacha, Julie and Aymeric, Leila was evicted for fake and therefore joined the Secret Room. On Day 45, La Voix revealed to Aymeric that only Sacha was evicted and Leila was in secret room, Aymeric joined Leila in Secret Room but  still lives in the main house.
: Jessica becomes another Leila's complice and is aware Leila is still in the house. La Voix gave them both the power to nominate one male and one female housemate to face the public's vote.
: During the live show, the red phone his apparition, all the housemates had to pass the phone to another and the last one who received it was nominated. As Sara was the last one to have it, she was nominated. To protect their secret, Nathalie and Vivian had the possibility to take Sara's nomination for one of them. They chose Vivian. Then, Leila received a dilemma: she could give Aymeric the possibility to see his brother but she would take Vivian's nomination. She accepted. Then, Sara and Steph could nominate Jessica but all the housemates money would be divided by two. They accepted, Jessica therefore became nominated next to Leila. But, Aymeric and Julie could replace Jessica and Leila with Nathalie and Vivian. They accepted, Nathalie and Vivian therefore became the nominees. Finally, Nathalie and Vivian had the possibility to save one of them, but clues of their secret would be revealed to the house. They accepted and saved Nathalie. Vivian therefore remained the only nominee.
: Vivian, as a nominee, had then to choose 2 housemates to win immunity. He chose Nathalie and Jessica. The other housemates faced eviction with him.
: In week 8, nominations were cancelled as Aymeric and Sara were ejected. The housemates have to choose if they merit to stay. Only Leila and Julie vote for the return of the two housemates. 
: Jessica won a free pass to the final. 
: In week 9, due to the last nominations before the final, there were no nominations, and all the housemates except to Jessica were up for eviction.

Nominations totals received

Nominations : Results 
 The results of nominations with percentages included

Ratings

Prime Time

After Secret

References

External links
  Official website for Secret Story
  Social network page for Secret Story
 Big brother news site

2014 French television seasons
08